WPJM is a Gospel music radio station located in Greer, South Carolina. The station is licensed by the FCC to broadcast on 800 AM with an ERP of 1000 Watts during the day and 438 Watts at night under a nondirectional pattern.

Station history
WPJM signed on the air June 15, 1949.  The original call letters were WEAB, EAB being the initials of the original owner Ed A. Burch. Mr Burch also owned the weekly newspaper, The Greer Citizen Currently, it programs an Urban Gospel format, and is the only station in the Greenville-Spartanburg area doing so.

External links
 Official Website

PJM